Mark Anstice (born 17 May 1967 in the Angus Glens area of Scotland) is a Scottish explorer, adventurous documentary reality television film maker and writer. He is best known for appearing in the Travel Channel's series Mark & Olly: Living with the Tribes with Oliver Steeds.

Army career
After school, Anstice travelled extensively throughout Australia and Asia.  In London he joined the 5th Royal Inniskilling Dragoon Guards of the British Army. Anstice spent six years in the guards with operational commitments in the Middle East, Central America and Bosnia, leaving the service in 1995 as a Captain.

Television career
In 2000, Mark travelled along with his friend Bruce Parry for 77 days to climb Puncak Mandala in the Indonesian part of New Guinea. This is the third highest mountain of Australasia, but is little known and rarely climbed (their ascent probably being only the third one). During the expedition, the team had first contact with some members of the Korowai tribe. In the course of the expedition, the adventure documentary, Extreme Lives: Cannibals and Crampons. was co-directed and written along with Bruce Parry. The film won both the Banff Mountain Film Festival and Kendal Mountain Film Festival.

Mark subsequently wrote the book First Contact, published by Eye Books., which was published in 2004.  chronicling the expedition to Mount Mandela.

In 2005, Mark took part in the recreation of the Terra Nova Expedition of Robert Falcon Scott and the Amundsen's South Pole expedition of Roald Amundsen as part of the BBC Blizzard: Race to the Pole documentary. The documentary reconstructed the 2500 km expedition using the same equipment, food and clothing as the original two teams, placing the setting in Greenland as dogs were no longer allowed in Antarctica.

Between 2006 and 2008 he co-presented, with Olly Steeds, three 8-part series for Travel Channel in each of which the duo went to live with a remote, jungle-dwelling tribe for three months. In 2009, amidst growing resentment at the way their experiences were edited for the viewing audience, and public controversy surrounding the edit of the third series Steeds left the team and the show was axed. Anstice went on to make a different series, 'Secrets of The Tribes', in West Africa. 
 
Mark Anstice currently runs the charity Fertile Roots Foundation.

Television filmography

 Extreme Lives: Cannibals and Crampons (2002)
 First Contact (2006) – a BBC Anthropology series presentation (set in West Papua New Guinea) surrounding the ethics of "First Contact" experiences staged by tour operators
 Blizzard: Race To The Pole (2006)
 Mark & Olly: Living with the Tribes (2007)
 Worlds Lost Tribes: The New Adventures of Mark and Olly (2007–2009)
 Secrets of the Tribes (2010)

Personal life
Anstice  is married to  Ayelen, who is Argentinian.

References

1967 births
Living people
5th Royal Inniskilling Dragoon Guards officers
British documentary filmmakers
Scottish military personnel